The Last Kingdom is a British historical fiction television series based on Bernard Cornwell's The Saxon Stories series of novels. The series was developed for television by Stephen Butchard and premiered on  10 October 2015 on BBC Two. For the second season, Netflix would co-produce the series. In 2018, the series was acquired by Netflix who continued to solely produce the series for three more seasons.  The series lasted for a total of 46 episodes across five seasons, with the final season airing on 9 March 2022. A feature-length sequel that is set to conclude the series, titled Seven Kings Must Die, is set to premiere on 14 April 2023 on Netflix.

Plot

Series One
The first series roughly covers the events of The Last Kingdom and The Pale Horseman, the first and second novels in Bernard Cornwell’s The Saxon Stories, however they are condensed for the screen. In the year 866, the Great Heathen Army's arrival in Britain is about to redefine the relationship between Vikings and Anglo-Saxons. Following the establishment of Danish rule in Jórvík and East Anglia, the show largely focuses on the resistance of the Kingdom of Wessex to ongoing Viking incursions to Southern England.

The first season covers the years 866–78. The main protagonist (named Osbert in childhood) is re-baptized as Uhtred after his elder brother Uhtred is killed by the Danes; his father, along with other Saxon noblemen of Northumbria, are killed in battle against the Danes. Only his uncle and stepmother survive. Uhtred and a Saxon girl named Brida are taken as slaves by Earl Ragnar to his home in Danish Northumbria. Ragnar comes to accept Uhtred as his own son, adopts him, and raises him as Uhtred Ragnarsson. Time passes, and Ragnar's daughter Thyra is about to be married, but fellow Danes attack the night before the wedding and set fire to the hall in which the family is sleeping. Ragnar is burned alive, and Thyra taken as a slave.  Only Uhtred and Brida escape as they have spent the night in the woods tending a charcoal kiln. The attackers are led by Kjartan, a disgruntled Viking who had been banished by Ragnar from his lands years earlier for an offence committed by Kjartan's son Sven. Uhtred vows to avenge his father Ragnar's death, while simultaneously hoping to reclaim Bebbanburg his birthright from his uncle, who seeks to kill Uhtred to keep Bebbanburg for himself. Uhtred is forced to choose between the kingdom of his ancestors and the people who have raised him, and his loyalties are constantly tested. The plot of series one culminates with the Battle of Edington.

Series Two
The second series roughly covers the happenings of Cornwell's third and fourth novels The Lords of the North and Sword Song. The second season covers the years 878 to 886 and shows Uhtred's quests in Northumbria, and Wessex and Mercia conflict with the brothers Sigefrid and Eric.

This was the final season to air on the BBC, before moving to Netflix.

Series Three
Beginning with the third series, the show was solely produced by Netflix. The third series is based on Cornwell’s fifth and sixth novels The Burning Land and Death of Kings, however there are considerable plot changes compared to the previous seasons. The third season roughly covers the years 893 to 900.

These episodes cover the decline in King Alfred's health and the continuing conflict between the Christians and Danes. One reviewer suggested that Netflix had a positive effect on the series, indicating: "With it came a certain increase in production values, most notably during the epic end-of-episode clash in which the swing of every sword and thwock of every shield hit firmly home," but added that "the blood-and-gore budget has also undergone a significant increase, thanks in large part to the arrival of the beautiful but psychotic Skade (Thea Sofie Loch Næss)".

All ten episodes of series three appeared on Netflix on 19 November 2018.

Series Four
The fourth series is based on Cornwell’s seventh and eighth novels The Pagan Lord and The Empty Throne. Similar to series three, there are significant plot changes from the novels. The fourth season takes place around 901 to 912 and deals with Danish attacks and political struggles in Mercia and attacks on Winchester.

All ten episodes of series four appeared on Netflix on 26 April 2020.

Series Five
The fifth season was announced as the final season in 2021. It is based on Cornwell’s ninth, tenth and thirteenth novels Warriors of the Storm, The Flame Bearer and War Lord. Similar to series three and four, there are significant plot changes from the novels.

All ten episodes of the final series appeared on Netflix on 9 March 2022.

Cast

Main

 Alexander Dreymon as Uhtred of Bebbanburg
 David Dawson as King Alfred (series 1–3)
 Tobias Santelmann as Ragnar the Younger (series 1–3)
 Emily Cox as Brida
 Adrian Bower as Leofric (series 1, recurring series 3)
 Thomas W. Gabrielsson as Guthrum (series 1)
 Simon Kunz as Odda the Elder (series 1–2)
 Harry McEntire as Aethelwold (series 1–3)
 Rune Temte as Ubba (series 1)
 Joseph Millson as Aelfric (series 1–2, 4)
 Brian Vernel as Odda the Younger (series 1)
 Amy Wren as Mildrith (series 1)
 Charlie Murphy as Queen Iseult (series 1)
 Ian Hart as Beocca (series 1–4)
 Eliza Butterworth as Aelswith, Alfred's wife and Queen of Wessex (series 2–5; recurring series 1)
 Thure Lindhardt as Guthred (series 2)
 Eva Birthistle as Hild, a nun and one of Uhtred's most trusted allies (series 2–5; recurring series 1)
 Gerard Kearns as Halig (series 2; recurring series 1)
 David Schofield as Abbot Eadred (series 2)
 Peri Baumeister as Gisela, Uthred's second wife and sister of Guthred (series 2–3)
 Peter McDonald as Brother Trew (series 2)
 Mark Rowley as Finan, a fierce Irish warrior sworn to Uhtred (series 2–5)
 Alexandre Willaume as Kjartan (series 2; recurring series 1)
 Julia Bache-Wiig as Thyra (series 2–3; recurring series 1)
 Ole Christoffer Ertvaag as Sven (series 2; recurring series 1)
 Björn Bengtsson as Sigefrid (series 2)
 Cavan Clerkin as Father Pyrlig, a Welsh priest and former warrior (series 2–5)
 Arnas Fedaravičius as Sihtric, Kjartan's son who becomes one of Uthred's allies (series 2–5)
 Christian Hillborg as Erik (series 2)
 Jeppe Beck Laursen as Haesten (series 2–5)
 Toby Regbo as Aethelred, Lord of the Mercians (series 2–4)
 Millie Brady as Princess Aethelflaed (series 2–5)
 James Northcote as Aldhelm (series 2–5)
 Adrian Bouchet as Steapa, Alfred's and later Edward's head Huscarl (series 2–4)
 Ewan Mitchell as Osferth, Alfred's illegitimate son and one of Uthred's allies (series 2–5)
 Simon Stenspil as Dagfinn, a chief of the Danes (series 2–3)

 Timothy Innes as Edward, King of the Anglo-Saxons (series 3–5)
 Thea Sofie Loch Næss as Skade, a Skald and Sorceress (series 3)
 Ola Rapace as Earl Sigurd "Bloodhair" (series 3)
 Magnus Bruun as Cnut, a powerful Danish Warlord and cousin of Ragnar (series 3–4)
 Adrian Schiller as Aethelhelm, a rich and powerful Ealdorman in Wessex (series 3–5)
 Kevin Eldon as Bishop Erkenwald, a bishop in service to Alfred (series 3)
 Jamie Blackley as Eardwulf, the commander of Lord Aethelred's household troops (series 4)
 Stefanie Martini as Eadith, the mistress of Ealdorman Aethelred and the younger sister of Eardwulf (series 4–5)
 Finn Elliott as Young Uhtred, Uhtred's son (series 4–5)
 Ruby Hartley as Stiorra, Uhtred's daughter (series 4–5)
 Richard Dillane as Ludeca, an Ealdorman of Mercia (series 4–5)
 Dorian Lough as Burgred, an Ealdorman of Mercia (series 4–5)
 Steffan Rhodri as King Hywel Dda (series 4)
 Nigel Lindsay as Rhodri (series 4)
 Eysteinn Sigurðarson as Sigtryggr, Norse king of Jórvík (series 4–5)
 Amelia Clarkson as Aelflaed, wife of King Edward and Aethelhelm's daughter (series 4–5; recurring series 3)
 Harry Gilby as Aethelstan, King Edward's illegitimate son who is under the protection of Uhtred (series 5)
 Patrick Robinson as Father Benedict (series 5)
 Phia Saban as Aelfwynn, Aethelflaed's daughter (series 5)
 Micki Stoltt as Rǫgnvaldr, a Viking warlord and brother of Sigtryggr (series 5)
 Harry Anton as Bresal, Aethelhelm's henchman and adviser (series 5)
 Ryan Quarmby as Cynlaef (series 5)
 Jaakko Ohtonen as Wolland (series 5)
 Ossian Perret as Wihtgar (series 5; recurring series 4)
 Ewan Horrocks as Aelfweard (series 5)
 Sonya Cassidy as Eadgifu (series 5)
 Rod Hallett as King Constantin (series 5)
 Bamshad Abedi-Amin as	Yahya (series 5)
 Ross Anderson as Domnal (series 5)

Recurring

Introduced in Series 1
 Matthew Macfadyen as Lord Uhtred
 Rutger Hauer as Ravn
 Peter Gantzler as Earl Ragnar
 Tom Taylor as Young Uhtred
 Henning Valin Jakobsen as Storri
 Jason Flemyng as King Edmund
 Alec Newman as King Aethelred
 Lorcan Cranitch as Father Selbix
 Victor McGuire as Oswald
 Sean Gilder as Wulfhere
 Jonas Malmsjö as Skorpa of the White Horse
 Paul Ritter as King Peredur
 Nicholas Rowe as Brother Asser

Introduced in Series 2
 Richard Rankin as Father Hrothweard
 Magnus Samuelsson as Clapa
 Anthony Cozens as Aidan
 Henrik Lundström as Rollo
 Marc Rissmann as Tekil
 Christopher Sciueref as Jonis
 Erik Madsen as Fiske
 Jóhannes Haukur as Sverri
 Oengus MacNamara as Bjorn
 Tibor Milos Krisko as Rypere
 Ingar Helge Gimle as Gelgill

Introduced in Series 3
 Ed Birch as Sigebriht
 Julia Brown as Ecgwynn
 Ian Conningham as Offa
 Tygo Gernandt as Jackdaw
 Jon Furlong as Brother Godwin
 Debbie Chazen as Sable
 Anton Saunders as Godric
 Ciáran Owens as Tidman
 Daniel Tuite as Brother Hubert
 Annamária Bitó as Aelfwynn
 Bernard Cornwell as Beornheard
 Lee Boardman as Guthlac

Introduced in Series 4
 Caspar Griffiths as Aethelstan
 Máté Haumann as Cenric
 Marcell Zsolt Halmy as Aelfweard
 Gabriel Harland as Young Cnut
 Tristan Harland as Esgar
 Debbie Chazen as Sable
 Helena Albright as Aelfwynn
 Anthony Cozens as Aidan
 Kirill Bánfalvi as Burgred's Son
 Richard Heap as Brother Oswi
 Nicholas Asbury as Brother Iestyn
 Oscar Skagerberg as Bjorgulf
 Julia Brown as Ecgwyn
 Antal Leisen as Creoda
 Kimberley Wintle as Taetan

Introduced in Series 5
 Emili Akhchina as Vibeke
 Ilona Chevakova as Ingrith
 Klara Tolnai as Sidgeflaed
 Lara Steward as Hella
 Kathy Peacock as Aalys

Episodes

Production

Development
The series started shooting in November 2014. It was produced by Carnival Films for BBC Two and BBC America. Nick Murphy (Prey, Occupation) served as co-executive producer and directed multiple episodes. For portrayals of the Vikings at sea, the Viking ship replica Havhingsten fra Glendalough was used. The series was filmed primarily in Hungary, with most scenes at the eight acres near Budapest owned by Korda Studios with its Medieval Village Set and surrounding mountains, forests and lakes.

Filming for the second series began in Budapest in June 2016. Richard Rankin, Gerard Kearns, Thure Lindhardt, Millie Brady, Erik Madsen, and Peter McDonald joined the cast. In August 2016, Aftonbladet reported that Swedish actors Björn Bengtsson and Magnus Samuelsson would join the main cast. Also that month, it was reported that Stephen Butchard would return as the sole script writer and that Netflix had signed on as an international co-production partner for the second series.

In April 2018, Netflix confirmed that a third series was in production, based on the books The Lords of the North and Sword Song, which would air exclusively on the streaming service, and Bernard Cornwell indicated that he had been offered a cameo appearance. Swedish actor Ola Rapace joined the cast for series 3, as Jarl Harald Bloodhair. Swedish director Erik Leijonborg was behind the camera for series 3; he has collaborated with Rapace on several Swedish TV series.

On 26 December 2018, the series was renewed for a fourth series by Netflix. On 7 July 2020, the series was renewed for a fifth series by Netflix. On 30 April 2021, it was announced that the series would conclude with the fifth series. Filming for season 5 wrapped in June 2021.

The final season will be followed by a feature-length film titled Seven Kings Must Die, whose filming finished on 19 March 2022.

Historical background
The main events of the reign of Alfred the Great and his heirs are well recorded, and a number of men called Uhtred ruled from Bamburgh Castle, most notably Uhtred the Bold more than a century later. The people identified as "Danes" came from many places in and around Denmark, including Southern Sweden and Norway. Historians believe that the Danish invaders of Northumbria came from Jutland in Denmark, as mentioned in Cornwell's books, as well as some of the Danish islands and East Denmark (southern Sweden).

Release
The first series of eight episodes premiered on 10 October 2015 in the United States on BBC America, and was broadcast shortly after in the United Kingdom on BBC Two on 22 October 2015. It became available online in the United States via Netflix on 6 July 2016. It was added to Netflix on 28 December 2015 in the following countries: Australia, Austria, Canada, Germany, Japan, New Zealand, Portugal, Spain and Switzerland. The first series was broadcast in the Spanish region of Catalonia on TV3 on 24 July 2017.

The second and third series were released on Netflix in the US, Canada, Denmark, The Netherlands, Switzerland, Germany, Austria, Spain, Japan, Australia, and Portugal.

Netflix was the sole distributor of the third series of ten episodes, produced by Carnival Films. On 26 December 2018, Netflix renewed the show for a fourth series, released on 26 April 2020 and once again produced by Carnival Films. It was renewed for a fifth and final season on 7 July 2020. On 9 February 2022, it was announced that the fifth season would be released on 9 March 2022.

Reception
The series has been met with a positive critical response. On Rotten Tomatoes, series one has an 87% approval rating based on reviews from 31 critics, with an average of 7.61/10. The website's critical consensus reads, "The Last Kingdom fuses beautiful cinematography and magnificent action sequences to create highly gratifying historical drama". On Metacritic, series 1 has a score of 78/100 based on 15 reviews. On Rotten Tomatoes, the second series received 86% (7 reviews) and the third series received 100% (7 reviews).

Sam Wollaston reviewed the first episode in The Guardian and warned, "It's wise not to get too attached to anyone in The Last Kingdom". Charlotte Runcie gave the opening episode four out of five in The Daily Telegraph, writing that the series had "satisfyingly high production values, a bloodthirsty appetite for violence and a proper cliffhanger." Wollaston and Runcie both remarked on the similarities between The Last Kingdom and Game of Thrones. Kari Croop of Common Sense Media also gave the series 4/5 stars, writing: "With high production values, strong writing, and compelling characters, this series rivals some of the best and bloodiest epics on TV". Dennis Perkins of The A.V. Club gave the first season a grade of B+, writing: "BBC America’s sprawling, arresting eight-part historical miniseries The Last Kingdom proves that there’s room enough on television for more than one Viking invasion."

Sean O'Grady in The Independent found that some of the language gave the series "a satisfyingly earthy quality", but he thought that the plot was "a little convoluted". The television reviewer for Private Eye was more critical, arguing that The Last Kingdom demonstrates how Game of Thrones "haunts the BBC", and that the series was directly derivative of both fantasy series and European dramas such as The Killing and Wallander, yet lacking the features that have made such series successful.

References

External links

 The Last Kingdom Official Website
 
 The Last Kingdom at BBC America
 The Last Kingdom on Netflix
 
 
 

2015 British television series debuts
2022 British television series endings
2010s British drama television series
2020s British drama television series
Television series set in the 9th century
BBC high definition shows
BBC television dramas
Costume drama television series
Cultural depictions of Alfred the Great
English-language Netflix original programming
Serial drama television series
Television shows based on British novels
Television series set in the Middle Ages
Television shows filmed in Hungary
Television shows set in Europe
Television series set in the Viking Age
Television series by Universal Television